The Restoration, or Bourbon Restoration (Spanish: Restauración borbónica), is the name given to the period that began on 29 December 1874—after a coup d'état by General Arsenio Martínez Campos ended the First Spanish Republic and restored the monarchy under Alfonso XII—and ended on 14 April 1931 with the proclamation of the Second Spanish Republic.

After almost a century of political instability and many civil wars, the aim of the Restoration was to create a new political system, which ensured stability by the practice of turnismo. This was the deliberate rotation of the Liberal and Conservative parties in the government, often achieved through electoral fraud. Opposition to the system came from Republicans, socialists, anarchists, Basque and Catalan nationalists, and Carlists.

Alfonso XII and the Regency of Maria Christina (1874–1898)

The pronunciamiento by Martínez Campos established Alfonso XII as king, marking the end of the First Spanish Republic. After this, the Constitution of 1876 was written and enforced during the whole restoration. This constitution established Spain as a constitutional monarchy with a bicameral legislature (Cortes Generales), consisting of an upper house (Senate), and a lower house (Congress of Deputies). This constitution gave the King the power to name Senators and to revoke laws if he wanted to, and he was also given the title of Commander-in-chief of the army.

These years were marked by economic prosperity. Ever since the end of the Napoleonic Wars in 1815, Spain's economy had fallen even further behind those of other European countries. During these years the modernization of the country took place on a large scale. On most fronts domestic production was increased, supported by extreme protectionist measures.

The two parties alternated in the government in a controlled process known as el turno pacífico; the Liberal Party was led by Sagasta and the Conservative Party by Canovas del Castillo. The caciques, powerful local figures, were used to manipulate election results, and as a result resentment of the system slowly built up over time and important nationalist movements in Catalonia, Galicia and the Basque Country, as well as unions, started to form.

Reign of Alfonso XIII and crisis of the system (1898–1923)

In 1898, Spain lost its last major overseas colonies (Cuba, Guam, Puerto Rico, and the Philippines) in the Spanish–American War. The rapid collapse was perceived as a disaster in Spain, undermining the credibility of both the government and its associated ideologies and almost leading to a military coup d'état led by Camilo Polavieja. This was the start of the system's decline, giving energy to all manner of conflicting opposition movements at a local and national level.

Spain would begin to rehabilitate internationally after the Algeciras Conference of 1906. In 1907 it signed a kind of defensive alliance with France and the United Kingdom, known as the Pact of Cartagena in case of war against the Triple Alliance. Spain improved economically due to its neutrality in the First World War. Spanish flu killed 200,000 Spaniards (1% of the population).

The failed attempts to conquer Morocco (Melilla War) caused great discontent at home and ended in a revolt in Barcelona, known as the Semana Tragica, in which the lower classes of Barcelona, backed by the anarchists, communists, and republicans, revolted against what they considered the unjust methods for recruiting soldiers. The government declared a state of war and sent the army to crush the revolt, causing over a hundred deaths and the execution of Francisco Ferrer. The socialist Unión General de Trabajadores (UGT) and the anarchist Confederación Nacional del Trabajo (CNT) decided to initiate a general strike across the country, but it failed because the unions could only mobilize urban workers.

The problems in Morocco worsened as an army of natives attacked the Spanish army. They achieved surprise and, due to the skill of the Moroccan chieftain, Abd-Al-Krim, virtually annihilated the Spanish army, advancing almost as far as Melilla in the Battle of Annual. This Spanish defeat was due to improper planning and was blamed on the top military officers, causing great discontent among the military, who felt misunderstood, because they had been directed to advance into the interior without adequate resources to occupy the difficult territory.

Dictatorship of Primo de Rivera (1923–1930)

The military discontent, the fear of anarchist terrorism or a proletarian revolution, and the rise of nationalist movements ultimately caused great agitation amongst the civilians and the military. On 13 September 1923, Miguel Primo de Rivera, Captain General of Catalonia, orchestrated a coup d'état, after issuing a manifesto blaming the problems of Spain on the parliamentary system. Alfonso XIII backed the General and named him Prime Minister. Primo de Rivera proceeded to suspend the Constitution and assume absolute powers as a dictator. He created the Unión Patriótica Española, which was meant to be the sole legal party, abolishing all other parties. During this time, he greatly increased government spending on business and public services, which caused his government to go bankrupt. He lost the support of the military and faced serious health problems. Opposition to his regime was so great that Alfonso XIII stopped supporting him and forced him to resign in January 1930.

Final year (1930–1931)

Alfonso XIII, in an attempt to return gradually to the previous system and restore his prestige, called on General Dámaso Berenguer to form a government. This failed utterly, as the King was considered a supporter of the dictatorship, and more and more political forces called for the establishment of a republic. Berenguer resigned and the King gave the government to Admiral Juan Bautista Aznar. Aznar called for local elections on 12 April 1931 in order to satisfy the democrats and republicans, to replace the dictatorship's local governments and to gradually re-introduce the restoration.

Although the monarchists had not lost all their support, the republican and socialist parties won some significant victories in major cities. Street riots ensued, calling for the removal of the monarchy. The army declared that they would not defend the King and on 14 April he fled Spain. The Second Spanish Republic was immediately established under a provisional government led by Niceto Alcalá-Zamora.

References

Sources
Barton, Simon. A History of Spain (2009) excerpt and text search
Beck, Earl Ray. Time of Triumph & Sorrow: Spanish Politics during the Reign of Alfonso XII, 1874–1885 (1979)
Ben-Ami, Shlomo. "The Dictatorship of Primo de Rivera: A Political Reassessment," Journal of Contemporary History, Jan 1977, Vol. 12 Issue 1, pp 65–84 in JSTOR
Carr, Raymond, ed. Spain: A History (2001) excerpt and text search
Esdaile, Charles J.  Spain in the Liberal Age: From Constitution to Civil War, 1808–1939 (2000) excerpt and text search
Hall, Morgan C. "Alfonso XIII and the Failure of the Liberal Monarchy in Spain, 1902–1923" Dissertation Abstracts International, 2003, Vol. 64 Issue 6, p2220-2220,
 Luengo, Jorge, and Pol Dalmau. "Writing Spanish history in the global age: connections and entanglements in the nineteenth century." Journal of global history 13.3 (2018): 425–445. online
Payne, Stanley G. "Spanish Conservatism 1834–1923," Journal of Contemporary History, Vol. 13, No. 4, (Oct. 1978), pp. 765–789  in JSTOR
Winston, Colin M. "The Proletarian Carlist Road to Fascism: Sindicalismo Libre," Journal of Contemporary History Vol. 17, No. 4 (Oct., 1982), pp. 557–585  in JSTOR

 
Modern history of Spain
1874 establishments in Spain
1931 disestablishments in Spain
States and territories established in 1874
States and territories disestablished in 1931
Spain
Former countries of the interwar period